Astrothelium robustosporum is a species of corticolous (bark-dwelling) lichen in the family Trypetheliaceae. Found in Brazil, it was formally described as a new species in 2016 by André Aptroot and Marcela Cáceres. The ascomata are pear-shaped (pyriform) and typically occur singly, immersed in the bark tissue, and have a one-sided (eccentric) black ostiole. The lichen does not react with any of the standard chemical spot tests, and thin-layer chromatography did not reveal the presence of any lichen products. The species epithet robustosporum refers to the ascospores, which have a single thickened transverse septa that divides the spore into two diamond-shaped cavities.

References

robustosporum
Lichen species
Lichens described in 2016
Taxa named by André Aptroot
Taxa named by Marcela Cáceres
Lichens of North Brazil